Oxneriaria is a genus of lichen-forming fungi in the family Megasporaceae. It has nine species, all of which are saxicolous (rock-dwelling), crustose lichens. The genus was circumscribed in 2017 by Sergey Kondratyuk and László Lőkös to contain species formerly in the Aspicilia mashiginensis species group. This species, now the type of the genus, was first described scientifically by Alexander Zahlbruckner as Lecanora mashiginensis. The genus name honours Ukrainian lichenologist Alfred Oxner, who, according to the authors, "provided important contribution [sic] to taxonomy of aspicilioid lichens and to biodiversity of polar lichens".

Oxneriaria is morphologically similar to Aspicilia, but differs from this genus in its mostly radiating thallus with either a wrinkled or lobate zone around the margins, in its generally smaller ascospores, and in the presence of the lichen product substictic acid. Species in the genus have a polar and arctic–alpine distribution.

Species

 Oxneriaria dendroplaca 
 Oxneriaria haeyrenii 
 Oxneriaria mashiginensis 
 Oxneriaria nikrapensis 
 Oxneriaria permutata 
 Oxneriaria rivulicola 
 Oxneriaria supertegens 
 Oxneriaria verruculosa 
 Oxneriaria virginea

References

Pertusariales
Lecanoromycetes genera
Taxa described in 2017
Lichen genera
Taxa named by Sergey Kondratyuk